Willy Hillen (born 22 April 1943) is a Dutch former sports shooter. He competed at the 1972 Summer Olympics and the 1976 Summer Olympics. As a coach, he also trained the Dutch air rifle team who later participated in the European Championship and contributed to training of youth groups.

In his hometown of Winterswijk, he is also famous for the  the special recipe of which he keeps secret.

References

External links
 

1943 births
Living people
Dutch male sport shooters
Olympic shooters of the Netherlands
Shooters at the 1972 Summer Olympics
Shooters at the 1976 Summer Olympics
People from Winterswijk
Sportspeople from Gelderland
20th-century Dutch people